The Sanjak of Mosul or Mosul Sanjak ( Musul Sancağı) was a sanjak in the Ottoman Empire with the city of Mosul, in present-day Iraq, as its administrative center.

History
The sanjak was established after Selim I occupied Mosul in 1516/1517. It was part of Diyarbekir Eyalet until 1534. It was then transferred to Luristan Eyalet, then Baghdad Eyalet. During the years of 1563–1566 and 1571–1573 it was part of Shahrizor Eyalet. In 1586 it became part of the newly established Mosul Eyalet.

In 1851 the Eyalet of Mosul was dissolved. The Sanjak of Mosul was not attached to another province until 1855, when it became part of Van Eyalet. In 1866 it was transferred to Baghdad Eyalet, which became Baghdad Vilayet in 1869. In 1880 it became part of the Vilayet of Mosul.

References

Mosul
States and territories established in 1516
Sanjaks of the Ottoman Empire in Asia
1516 establishments in the Ottoman Empire
1918 disestablishments in the Ottoman Empire